Mandar Madhukar Deshmukh (born 20 October 1974) is an Indian physicist specialising in nanoscale and mesoscopic physics and affiliated to Tata Institute of Fundamental Research, Mumbai. He was awarded the Shanti Swarup Bhatnagar Prize for Science and Technology in 2015, the highest science award in India, in the physical sciences category. He obtained BTech degree from Indian Institute of Technology Bombay in 1996 and PhD degree from Cornell University under the guidance of D.C. Ralph in 2002. Before coming to Tata Institute of Fundamental Research, he was a postdoctoral researcher in the group of Hongkun Park at Harvard University.

Personal life
His wife Prita Pant also Ph.D. from Cornell University is an associate professor at IIT Bombay.

References

External links
 Deshmukh's home page

1974 births
Living people
20th-century Indian physicists
Cornell University alumni
IIT Bombay alumni